Musselman is an unincorporated community in Ross County, in the U.S. state of Ohio.

History
A train depot was built at Musselman in 1877 when the railroad was extended to that point. A post office called Musselman Station was established in 1879, the name was changed to Musselman in 1880, and the post office closed in 1908.

References

Unincorporated communities in Ross County, Ohio
Unincorporated communities in Ohio
1877 establishments in Ohio
Populated places established in 1877